Alberto Pellegrini (born 22 December 1970) is a former Italian paralympic fencer who won six medals at the Summer Paralympics.

References

External links
 
 Andrea Pellegrini at Ability Channel

1970 births
Living people
Paralympic wheelchair fencers of Italy
Paralympic gold medalists for Italy
Paralympic silver medalists for Italy
Paralympic bronze medalists for Italy
Medalists at the 1996 Summer Paralympics
Medalists at the 2000 Summer Paralympics
Medalists at the 2004 Summer Paralympics
Medalists at the 2008 Summer Paralympics
Paralympic medalists in wheelchair fencing
Wheelchair fencers at the 1996 Summer Paralympics
Wheelchair fencers at the 2000 Summer Paralympics
Wheelchair fencers at the 2004 Summer Paralympics
Wheelchair fencers at the 2008 Summer Paralympics